Ellingham Priory was a medieval monastic house in Ellingham, Hampshire, England. It was founded by William de Soleres in 1160. It was a cell to the Abbey of Saint-Sauveur-le-Vicomte in Normandy. The church of Ellingham formed part of the grant of William de Solers to Ellingham Priory.

It was dissolved in 1414 and sold to Eton College in 1462.

References

External links
The Priory of Ellingham  - Victoria County History of Hampshire
Ellingham Priory - Pastscape

Priories in Hampshire
1160 establishments in England
1414 disestablishments in England
Christian monasteries established in the 12th century
Religious organizations established in the 1160s